The Fifth Texas Legislature met from November 7, 1853, to February 13, 1854, in its regular session. All members of the House of Representatives and about half of the members of the Senate were elected in 1853.

Sessions
 5th Regular session: November 7, 1853 – February 13, 1854

Party summary

Officers

Senate
 Lieutenant Governor David Catchings Dickson, Democrat
 President pro tempore M. D. K. Taylor, Democrat, Regular session
 Guy Morrison Bryan, Democrat, Regular session

House of Representatives
 Speaker of the House  Hardin Richard Runnels, Democrat

Members

Senate
Members of the Texas Senate for the Fifth Texas Legislature:

House of Representatives
Members of the House of Representatives for the Fifth Texas Legislature. There are 73 districts at this time, 16 of them just created this session:

 John David German Adrian
 Hamilton P. Bee
 William H. Bourland, Democrat
 George E. Burney
 Horace Cone
 David Catchings Dickson, Democrat
 Benjamin Cromwell Franklin
 Lindsay Hagler, San Patricio County
 Bird Holland
 John Byler Mallard
 Samuel A. Maverick, Democrat,
 William Menefee
 Emory Rains
 James Reily
Hardin Richard Runnels, Democrat
 Moses Fisk Roberts
 Gustav Schleicher
 Charles William Tait
 Robert H. Taylor
 Amasa Turner
 George Washington Whitmore
  Wesley Clark Walker, Democrat

Membership changes

Senate

External links

05 Texas Legislature
1853 in Texas
1854 in Texas
1853 U.S. legislative sessions
1854 U.S. legislative sessions